The Autotrix was a British three-wheeled cyclecar manufactured by Edmunds, Wadden & Co in Weybridge, Surrey between 1911 and 1914.

A review of the 1912 Motor Cycle and Cycle Car Show at Olympia reported that the car had undergone several improvements since it was shown at the 1911 show, particularly in the area of the rear suspension, and overall it bore little resemblance to its predecessor. They stated that it would be difficult to point out a more promising three-wheeler for touring purposes, especially from the point of view of comfort, in the whole of the exhibits. Three models were available, a 6 hp and 8 hp air-cooled and an 8 hp water-cooled.

See also
 List of car manufacturers of the United Kingdom

References

Vintage vehicles
Three-wheeled motor vehicles
Cyclecars
Defunct motor vehicle manufacturers of England
Vehicle manufacturing companies established in 1911
1911 establishments in England
Vehicle manufacturing companies disestablished in 1914
1914 disestablishments in England